Dante Nicholas (born 20 September 1998) is a United States Virgin Islands international footballer who plays as a midfielder.

Career statistics

International

References

External links
 Dante Nicholas at the La Roche University

1998 births
Living people
United States Virgin Islands soccer players
United States Virgin Islands international soccer players
Association football midfielders